Rudra is a Rigvedic god of the storm, the hunt, death, Nature and the Wind.

Rudra may also refer to:

Rudras, followers  or aspect of Rudra
Rudra Sampradaya, a Hindu Vaishnava sampradaya (tradition)
Rudra,  the eleventh chakra (group) of Melakarta ragas
 Rudra (film), a 1989 Kannada film directed by K. S. R. Das
Rudra (band), a Singaporean death metal band
Rudra (spider), a genus of jumping spider
Rudra: Boom Chik Chik Boom, an Indian animated television series
Rudra, one of the bosses in Devil May Cry 3: Dante's Awakening along with Agni
Treasure of the Rudras, a role-playing video game released by Square in 1996
HAL Rudra, the WSI (Weapon Systems Integrated) version of HAL Dhruv
Rudra (actress), Indian film and television actress
2629 Rudra, a Mars-crossing asteroid
 Rudradeva, 12th century Kakatiya ruler of southern India